Dominik Crête (born July 7, 1991) is a Canadian kayaker who competes primarily in the sprint distances. Crête is the reigning Pan American Games champion in the K-1 200 m distance. He started kayaking at the age of 11 but quit to focus on football. A meeting with Olympian Richard Dober Jr. in 2015 convinced him to return to the sport of kayaking. Crête studied police techniques at CEGEP de Trois-Rivières and currently works as a special constable for Hydro-Quebec.

References

1991 births
Canadian male canoeists
Living people
Sportspeople from Trois-Rivières
Canoeists at the 2019 Pan American Games
Pan American Games gold medalists for Canada
Pan American Games medalists in canoeing
Medalists at the 2019 Pan American Games

.